Raorchestes annandalii (known also as Annandale's bush frog, Himalaya bubble-nest frog, or Himalaya foam nest frog) is a species of frog in the family Rhacophoridae. It is found in the eastern Himalayas in India, Nepal, and Bhutan.
Its natural habitats are subtropical or tropical moist montane forests and subtropical or tropical high-altitude shrubland.

References

External links
 

annandalii
Amphibians of Bhutan
Frogs of India
Amphibians of Nepal
Taxonomy articles created by Polbot
Amphibians described in 1906